Alexandre Escudier Agostinho (born September 18, 1986) is a freestyle swimmer from Portugal, who represented his home country in several European and World Championships. He is also the Portuguese record holder in both 50m and 100m freestyle (long and short course pool).

He represents and trains at Portinado - Associação de Natação de Portimão since he was eight years old.

Agostinho has both Portuguese and French nationality. He was born in Tarbes (France). His father is Portuguese and his mother is French.

References

External links
Alexandre Agostinho profile at Eurosport

1986 births
Living people
Sportspeople from Tarbes
Portuguese male freestyle swimmers
Portuguese people of French descent
People from Portimão
Sportspeople from Faro District